Still Going Strong is the eleventh studio album by Canadian heavy metal band Anvil, released in 2002.

Track listing

Personnel
Anvil
Steve "Lips" Kudlow – vocals, lead guitar
Ivan Hurd – lead guitar
Glenn Five – bass
Robb Reiner – drums

Production
Pierre Rémillard – engineer, mixing
Andy Khrem – mastering
Torsten Hartmann – executive producer

References

Anvil (band) albums
2002 albums
Massacre Records albums